Following are lists of members of the Queensland Legislative Council:

1860–1869
1870–1879
1880–1889
1890–1899
1900–1909
1910–1916
1917–1922